The 2015 FIFA Beach Soccer World Cup CONMEBOL qualifier, also commonly known as the 2015 South American Beach Soccer Championship, was the sixth Beach Soccer World Cup qualification championship for South America, held from April 19–26 at Playa del Murciélago, in Manta, Ecuador.

The qualifiers were not coordinated by CONMEBOL at the time. The event was organised by Beach Soccer Worldwide (BSWW), under the FIFA Beach Soccer World Cup Qualifier title. CONMEBOL reported on the event under the title of South American Beach Soccer Championship. CONMEBOL eventually began organising the qualifiers in 2017, under a new title.

Brazil defeated Paraguay to be crowned champions, and both teams together with third place Argentina qualified for the 2015 FIFA Beach Soccer World Cup.

Participating teams and draw
A total of 10 teams entered the tournament. This was the first time in the history of the CONMEBOL Beach Soccer Championship that all ten CONMEBOL teams participated in the competition.

 (hosts)

The draw of the tournament was held on 27 March 2015 at Luque. The 10 teams were drawn into two groups of five teams.

Group stage
Each team earns three points for a win in regulation time, two points for a win in extra time, one point for a win in a penalty shoot-out, and no points for a defeat.

All times are local, Ecuador Time (UTC−5).

Group A

Group B

Knockout stage

Bracket

Fifth place semi-finals

Semi-finals

Ninth place match

Seventh place match

Fifth place match

Third place match

Final

Final ranking

Awards

Top goalscorers
12 goals
 Luis Do Nacimiento "Datinha"

10 goals
 Pedro Morán

9 goals
 Lucas Medero

8 goals

 Bruno da Silva Xavier
 Segundo Moreira
 Jesús Amado Rolón

7 goals

 Victor Manuel Alejandro Belaunde Muñoz
 Alberto Andrés Echeverría Alegría
 Juan López
 Angelo Castro Gordillo
 Sócrates Vidal Moscoso

References

External links

, beachsoccer.com
, CONMEBOL.com 
, FIFA.com

Qualification CONMEBOL
2015
2015 in beach soccer